YouTrack is a proprietary, commercial browser-based bug tracker, issue tracking system and project management software developed by JetBrains. It focuses on query-based issue search with auto-completion, manipulating issues in batches, customizing the set of issue attributes, and creating custom workflows.

Architecture
YouTrack uses the language-oriented programming paradigm and now the frontend is written on JavaScript, while the backend part relies on Kotlin (programming language), a programming language created by the same software house. It uses an embedded Xodus database to read and store data. For remote procedure calls, YouTrack supports a RESTful API. JetBrains offers YouTrack in cloud hosted and on premises versions.

Integration with external tools
Standard YouTrack integrations include import from Jira, Mailbox Integration, Zendesk Integration, and an integrated working environment with Upsource and TeamCity. Integrations with GitHub, BitBucket, and GitLab are provided out of the box, while connections to other version control systems are supported via the TeamCity or Upsource integration. TeamCity supports connections to repositories in ClearCase, CVS, Git, Mercurial, Perforce, SourceGear Vault, StarTeam, Subversion, Team Foundation Server, and Visual SourceSafe. Upsource supports connections to repositories in Git, Mercurial, Perforce, and Subversion.

YouTrack supports integration with several popular test management tools: PractiTest, TestLink, TestLodge, and TestRail.

YouTrack can also be integrated with Slack workplace.

Confluence integration is performed by adding macros to insert links to issues and insert reports into Confluence Pages.

YouTrack can integrate with JetBrains IDEs.

YouTrack is capable of importing issues from Jira, CSV file, Bugzilla, FogBugz, GitHub, MantisBT, Redmine, Trac, or another YouTrack Server.

YouTrack also supports user authentication.

User interface
YouTrack's Ajax-based user interface allows both keyboard and mouse interaction. Searching for issues is implemented via search query syntax and performed from a single search box.

YouTrack REST API
YouTrack REST API allows developers to perform various actions programmatically, including:

 Importing existing projects and issues from other issue tracking systems.
 Creating, modifying, getting all the issues attributes.
 Manipulating projects, users, groups and roles. This is done with Hub via the Hub REST API, a user and a permission management system by JetBrains. YouTrack 6.0 and later comes with Hub built-in.

See also
 Comparison of issue-tracking systems

References

External links
 Official website

Bug and issue tracking software
Open-source software hosting facilities
Java (programming language) software